Reid Bay is an Arctic waterway in the Qikiqtaaluk Region, Nunavut, Canada.  It is located in Davis Strait off Baffin Island's Cumberland Sound.

Geography
The habitat is characterized by open sea, inlets, coastal marine features, coastal cliffs, rocky marine shores, scree, and boulders.

Fauna
The uninhabited bay area is a Canadian Important Bird Area (#NU072), and International Biological Program site (Region 9, Site 7–9). Notable bird species include: black-legged kittiwake, colonial water birds/seabirds, glaucous gull, Iceland gull, northern fulmar, and thick-billed murre.

The former Reid Bay Key Migratory Bird Terrestrial Habitat site has been renamed Akpait (NU Site 28), coinciding with its location at Akapit Fiord.

References

Bays of Baffin Island
Bays of Qikiqtaaluk Region
Important Bird Areas of Qikiqtaaluk Region
Important Bird Areas of Arctic islands
Seabird colonies